Pooran may refer to:

 Pooran, Jalore, a village in Jalore district, Rajasthan
 Pooran (singer) (1934–1990), Iranian singer
 Pooran (name), a given name and surname (including a list of persons with the name)

See also 
 Puran (disambiguation)